Cande may refer to:

 Candé, a commune in western France
 Čande, a village in Bosnia and Herzegovina
 CANDE, a command-line shell
 Candé, a surname:
 Baciro Candé, Guinea-Bissauan footballer
 Braima Candé, Portuguese footballer
 Mamadu Candé, Guinea-Bissauan footballer
 Candel Astra, also known as cande, an Uruguayan brand of candy

See also 
 Candé-sur-Beuvron, a commune in the Loir-et-Cher, central France
 Candes-Saint-Martin, a commune in the Indre-et-Loire, central France
 Château de Candé, a castle in the Indre-et-Loire
 Emmanuel Candès (born 1970), mathematician
 Kande (disambiguation)
 Candy (disambiguation)
 Candi (disambiguation)